While There is Still Time is a 1943 short Australian dramatised documentary about Australian soldiers during World War II directed by Charles Chauvel.

It was the second in a series of films produced by the Austerity Loan Campaign.

Premise
A young woman, Gracie, is bored with her factory work and dissatisfied with war life. Her soldier boyfriend, Jim, is blinded while fighting overseas, and writes her a letter which inspires Gracie and her workmates to make sacrifices and win the war.

Cast
Noala Warren as Gracie 
Peter Finch as Jim
Chips Rafferty
John Nugent  
Beatrice Wenban  
Bobbie Hunt  
Grant Taylor

Reception
The Sydney Morning Herald wrote that:
Charles Chauvelss high ranking as Australia's leading film producer director is once again endorsed by a first-class production. This is easily the most impressive, most gripping locally-made documentary yet screened here. Its message is the memory it leaves, more than its brief, indirect request for the support of the austerity loan. Mr. Chauvel has most effectively clothed propaganda with compelling drama. As it should, the film will make many uncomfortable. Every one of its thirteen minutes is vibrant with quiet domestic realism and the humorous and tragic notes of its brief, but very boiling, Libyan episode... The film has as its theme the routing of selfishness by the recogni-tion of sacrifice. Its implications cut deep, and the narrative, poignant and very convincing, will leave none un-moved, for the film has an emotional quality rare in Australian productions. Acted by some of our most natural screen players, it gives newcomer Noala Warren the leading role, which she plays with astonishing poise and ability.

References

External links
While There is Still Time at Australian Screen Online
While There is Still Time at National Film and Sound Archive

1943 films
Australian documentary films
1943 documentary films
Australian black-and-white films